The National Alliance for Good Governance is a political party in Zimbabwe. 
Its candidate, Shaka Maya, won 0.5% at the presidential elections of 9–11 March 2002. 
After the last legislative elections, 31 March 2005, the party remained without parliamentary representation.

Political parties in Zimbabwe